Gerard H. Schemmel (born November 26, 1959) is an American sportscaster in Denver, Colorado working as a play by play radio announcer for Major League Baseball's Colorado Rockies and for KFKA Radio in Greeley, CO, as the radio voice of the University of Northern Colorado Bears. He is the creator and host of "Amazing Americans," a weekly national radio show. Schemmel served as play-by-play announcer for the NBA's Denver Nuggets, calling their games from 1992 to 2010.     

Schemmel is also a survivor of the crash-landing of United Airlines Flight 232 on July 19, 1989. After escaping the plane, he returned to the wreckage to rescue an 11-month-old baby.  His book, Chosen to Live describes the experience.

In June 2015, Schemmel competed in the Race Across America, a 3,000-mile bicycle race from Oceanside, California, to Annapolis, Maryland, as part of a two-person relay team.  He and Brad Cooper won the two-person relay division, finishing in 7 days, 14 hours. In 2021, he attempted RAAM as a solo racer but was forced to withdraw from the race when he encountered 120 degree temps in the Mojave Desert and suffered from Heat Stroke. In 2017, Schemmel set the solo age group record in the "Colorado Crossing," a bike race across Colorado, spanning 468 miles. He finished in 33 hours, 3 minutes, just 54 minutes from the all-time speed record for the event, set in 1992. Schemmel has also completed nine triathlons and three marathons.

Schemmel is a 1982 graduate of Washburn University; he earned a J.D. degree from the same school in 1985. He played baseball at Washburn and coached there for three years. He spent a year with the Continental Basketball Association, serving as both Deputy Commissioner and Commissioner.

He is the younger brother of Jeff Schemmel, a former college track and field All-American, long-time college athletic administrator and former athletic director at San Diego State. They are natives of Madison, SD.

References

Further reading

External links
 Jerry Schemmel's Official Web Site

1959 births
Living people
American radio sports announcers
College basketball announcers in the United States
College football announcers
Colorado Rockies announcers
Denver Nuggets announcers
Green Bay Packers announcers
Major League Baseball broadcasters
Minnesota Timberwolves announcers
Minor League Baseball broadcasters
Sportspeople from Sioux Falls, South Dakota
Survivors of aviation accidents or incidents
Washburn Ichabods baseball players